Khosrov Meliki Harutyunyan (May 30, 1948) is an Armenian politician who served as the Prime Minister of Armenia from 30 July 1992 until 2 February 1993. Harutyunyan is the Chairman of the Christian Democratic Union of Armenia.

References

Living people
1948 births
Prime Ministers of Armenia

Presidents of the National Assembly (Armenia)